Horace Patton Ramey (February 12, 1885, Virginia – September 15, 1974, Sun City, Arizona) was an American athlete.  He competed at the 1908 Summer Olympics in London.

Ramey won his preliminary heat of the 400 metres with a time of 51.0 seconds, advancing to the semifinals.  There, he placed second to John Taylor in his semifinal heat.  Ramey's time was 50.5 seconds; Taylor's was less than a second faster at 49.8 seconds.  Ramey did not advance to the final.

In the 800 metres, Ramey did not finish his semifinal heat and did not advance to the final.

References

Sources
 
 
 

1885 births
1974 deaths
Athletes (track and field) at the 1908 Summer Olympics
Olympic track and field athletes of the United States
American male sprinters
American male middle-distance runners